Loose Talk may refer to:
 Loose Talk (British TV series), a television chat show
 Loose Talk (Pakistani TV series), a television comedy show
 "Loose Talk" (song), a 1954 song written by Hardy Turner